Sadia Khan is a Pakistani television and film actress. She is better known for her role Emaan in Khuda Aur Muhabbat season 1 and 2. She was last seen playing a role of Maryam in TV One's Maryam Periera (2018).

Career
Khan is known for playing a variety of roles in a number of television serials including Eman in Khuda Aur Muhabbat (2011), Naina Syed in Laa (2014), Umm-e-Hani in Shayad, (2017) and Maryam in Maryam Periera (2018). Khan also appeared in films Dunno Y2... Life Is a Moment (2015) and Abdullah: The Final Witness (2016).

Filmography

References

External links
Sadia Khan on imdb

21st-century Pakistani actresses
Living people
Pakistani television actresses
1987 births